Diane Pathieu is an American television anchor who works for WLS-TV in Chicago.

Biography
Pathieu born and raised to an Assyrian family in the Rogers Park neighborhood of Chicago. Her mother is an immigrant from Syria and her father is an immigrant from Lebanon. In 2001, she graduated with a B.A. from Columbia College. While in school, she worked at Metro/Shadow Traffic and WMAQ-TV. After graduation, she moved to Iowa to become an anchor and producer at KFXB-TV in Dubuque, Iowa. In 2005, she accepted a position at WTMJ-TV in Milwaukee as a reporter on the morning newscast and as anchor for the noon newscast. In December 2011, she moved to WLS-TV where she serves as general assignment reporter and fill-in anchor.

Pathieu is married. She also speaks Assyrian.

References

Living people
American television news anchors
American people of Assyrian descent
American women television journalists
1978 births
Columbia College Chicago alumni